José Manuel Entrecanales Domecq (born 1 January 1963) is a Spanish businessman and former banker. In 2004, he succeeded his late father as chairman and CEO of Acciona, a global leader in infrastructure, renewable energy and water. In 2019, Forbes ranked him the 85th richest person in Spain, estimating his personal wealth at US$362 million, although his family fortune is estimated at around US$3.6 billion.

Entrecanales has been highlighted as a key leader of a new generation of Spanish businessmen "shaped by family roots but identifying fully with modernisation". He is a firm advocate of the fight against climate change at a corporate level, which earned him the Order of the Rising Sun, as well as being asked to speak frequently at global forums, including the 2019 UN Climate Change Conference.

Biography 
José Manuel Entrecanales was born 1 January 1963 in Madrid to an influential family of businessmen. His father was José María Entrecanales y de Azcárate, Chairman of Acciona (son of José Entrecanales e Ibarra, co-founder of the company) and his mother, Blanca Domecq y Zurita, was the daughter of the 2nd Viscount of Almocadén. Entrecanales read Economics at the Complutense University of Madrid.

In 1985, he began his career as an investment banker at Merrill Lynch in New York and later, London. Between 1995 and 2007, he was chairman of Vodafone España and between 2007 and 2009 he shared the presidencies of Endesa and Acciona.

Personal life
Entrecanales is married to María Carrión, and has 4 children: José, Gonzalo, Clotilde and Gerardo. His three sons attended Eton College. He is a polo enthusiast as well as a keen golfer with a 5,2 handicap, practising both sports at Puerta de Hierro.

Professional career
He began his career in 1985 in Merrill Lynch, sharing his time between New York and London. He moved to Acciona in 1991. In 1995, the family business bought a majority share package of a mobile company called Airtel and José Manuel Entrecanales was named CEO in 2000, replacing Juan Abelló. In 2003, Vodafone bought Acciona’s shares of Airtel and Entrecanales was the CEO of Vodafone Spain up until October 2007.

In 2004, he inherited the presidency of the Acciona Group from his father. As CEO of Acciona, José Manuel Entrecanales has transformed the construction and engineering company into a global infrastructure, energy and water services company with more than 40,000 employees in 65 countries. In 2007, Acciona bought 25% of Endesa and Entrecanales was named its CEO until they sold its shares in 2009.

Distinctions
An advocate of sustainable development and the fight against climate change, José Manuel Entrecanales is a member of the Alliance of CEO Climate Leaders of the World Economic Forum, the World Business Council for Sustainable Development, the United Nations Global Compact LEAD and the Corporate Leaders Group for Climate Change.

In addition, José Manuel Entrecanales is a Trustee of the Princess of Asturias Foundation, the Princess of Girona Foundation, the Prado Museum and the Alalá Foundation, as well as Vice President of the Fundación Pro CNIC and the Instituto de Empresa Familiar.

He is Chairman of acciona.org, a foundation dedicated to promoting universal access to water and energy. In 2009, he created the Fundación José Manuel Entrecanales Innovación y Emprendimiento para la innovación en sostenibilidad, which, among other things, acts as a business angel for companies to help them improve the use of resources (energy, water, etc.). He has invested in Worldsensing, Waynabox4, Onyx Solar, DEXMA, Aida Centre5, Redbooth, Change your Flight, Biicode and Saluspot.

Honours
  Japan: Order of the Rising Sun (2018)
 Sorolla Medal (2017) from the Hispanic Society of America

See also

Economy of Spain

References 

Complutense University of Madrid alumni
1963 births
People from Madrid
Living people
20th-century Spanish businesspeople
Spanish bankers
People educated at Eton College